Osberg is a surname. Notable people with the surname include:

Carl A. Osberg (1920–1942), American pilot
Lars Osberg, Canadian economist
Sally R. Osberg (born 1950), American business executive
Sigurd Osberg (born 1933), Norwegian Lutheran bishop